The Southwest Transitway is a bus rapid transit dedicated roadway in Winnipeg, Manitoba, Canada, which commenced operation in April 2012.

The first section was built parallel to the railway tracks running southwest from Queen Elizabeth Way at The Forks to Pembina Highway at Jubilee Avenue. An extension from Jubilee Avenue to Markham Road and the University of Manitoba was then built, which opened on April 12, 2020. Bus rapid transit services through the downtown Winnipeg area use the Graham Avenue Transit Mall and other bus priority routes.

Routes
BLUE: Service to University of Manitoba or St. Norbert.
47 Transcona - Pembina: Service to University of Manitoba. Enters/exits the Southwest Transitway just south of Jubilee Station; only observing stops at Harkness Station, Osborne Station, Fort Rouge Station and Jubilee Station. 
65 Grant Express: Service to Ridgewood - enters/exits the Southwest Transitway just south of Osborne Station; only observing stops at Harkness Station and Osborne Station (Rush Hour Only). 
66 Grant: Service to Polo Park or Unicity/Dieppe Loop - enters/exits the Southwest Transitway just after Osborne Station; only observing stops at Harkness Station and Osborne Station.

Rapid transit stations

Balmoral Station

The renovated former Winnipeg Bus Terminal (formerly a Greyhound Canada bus depot) located next to the University of Winnipeg, is the downtown terminus for rapid transit routes.

Harkness Station
Located at Harkness and Stradbrook. Exit point for routes en route to Downtown. Transfer point for Route 635 with service between Osborne Village and Misericordia Health Centre.

Osborne Station
Constructed on a bridge over Osborne Street near Osborne Junction. This station is the only covered station on the Southwest Transitway.

Fort Rouge Station
Located in the Fort Rouge Yards area off Morley Avenue. Transfers can be made to Route 95 with service to Riverview and South Tuxedo at this station, also the only station that had a kiss & ride, allowing drivers to drop off passengers at the station

Jubilee Station
It was proposed that the station be built near the, at-the-time, end of the Transitway, just northeast of the Pembina/Jubilee underpass. City Council was set to vote on approval of the project in late 2012. The station opened in 2015.

Beaumont Station 
Located in the Parker Lands, at the north end of Beaumont Street, just east of Georgina Street. Transfer point for Routes 29, 641 and 677.

Seel Station 
Located at the east end of Seel Avenue, north of McGillivray. Transfer point for Routes 642, 650, 690, 691 and 694. Also the location of a Park and Ride.

Clarence Station 
Located to the north of Clarence Avenue. Also the location of a Park and Ride.

Chevrier Station 
Located to the north of Chevrier Blvd. Transfer point for Route 649.

Plaza Station 
Located at the west end of Plaza Drive, north of Bishop Grandin.

Chancellor Station 
Located north and south of Chancellor Drive. Transfer point for Routes 676 and 693. The St. Norbert and University of Manitoba branches of the BLUE split south of here.

Southpark Station 
Located on Southpark Drive, west of Pembina Highway. Transfer point for Routes 662 and 693.

Markham Station 
Located north of Markham Road. Transfer point for Routes 662 and 693.

Stadium Station 
Located at the east end of Bohemier Trail, west of University Crescent. Terminal for extra buses operating to Investors Group Field on game days.

University of Manitoba Station 
Located on Dafoe Road, west of Alumni Lane. It is the terminus for all routes serving the University of Manitoba.

References

External links
Southwest Transitway

Winnipeg Transit